Anjirestan (also Romanized as Anjīrestān; also known as Anjīr-e Sīgān and Anjīr Sīrkan) is a village in Maskun Rural District, Jebalbarez District, Jiroft County, Kerman Province, Iran. At the 2006 census, its population was 40, consisting of 9 families.

References 

Populated places in Jiroft County